The county governor of Sogn og Fjordane county in Norway represented the central government administration in the county. On 1 January 2019, the office was merged with the county governor of Hordaland into the county governor of Vestland.

The county called Nordre Bergenhus amt was established by the king in 1763 when it was split off from the large Bergenhus amt. The seat of the amt was at Leikanger. Prior to 1919, this county was subordinate to the diocesan governor of Bergen.

The county governor is the government's representative in the county. The governor carries out the resolutions and guidelines of the Storting and government. This is done first by the county governor performing administrative tasks on behalf of the ministries. Secondly, the county governor also monitors the activities of the municipalities and is the appeal body for many types of municipal decisions.

Names
The word for county (amt or fylke) has changed over time as has the name of the county. From 1671 until 1918 the title was Amtmann i Nordre Bergenhus amt. From 1 January 1919 until 1 January 2019, the title was Fylkesmann i Sogn og Fjordane fylke.

List of county governors
Sogn og Fjordane county has had the following governors:

References

Sogn og Fjordane